Joseph Robert Weisberger (August 3, 1920 – December 7, 2012) was an American politician and jurist.

Weisberger served in the Rhode Island State Senate as a Republican. He was named a Rhode Island state court judge and then named to the Rhode Island Supreme Court where he was the chief justice from 1993 until his retirement in 2000.

Notes

1920 births
2012 deaths
Republican Party Rhode Island state senators
Chief Justices of the Rhode Island Supreme Court
20th-century American judges
Brown University alumni
Harvard Law School alumni